François Place  (born 2 July 1989) is a French freestyle skier.

Career
He competed in the 2017 FIS Freestyle World Ski Championships, and in the 2018 Winter Olympics.

He participated at the FIS Freestyle Ski and Snowboarding World Championships 2019, where he won the gold and became World Champion. Two years later in Idre Fjall at the FIS Freestyle Ski and Snowboarding World Championships 2021 Place went on to take silver.

References

External links

1989 births
Living people
French male freestyle skiers
Olympic freestyle skiers of France
Freestyle skiers at the 2018 Winter Olympics
Freestyle skiers at the 2022 Winter Olympics
Sportspeople from Albertville